Huiramba is a town in the state of Michoacán, Mexico, which is the main settlement of Huiramba Municipality. In 2011 it had 3,307 inhabitants.

References

Populated places in Michoacán